Mery Elizabeth Fernandes Andrade (born December 31, 1975) is a former professional basketball player and current assistant coach for the Birmingham Squadron of the NBA G League. She played five seasons in the Women's National Basketball Association (WNBA).

Coaching career
After four seasons as an assistant at the University of San Diego, Andrade was added to the coaching staff of the NBA G League’s Erie BayHawks as an assistant for the 2019–20 season.

In May 2022, Andrade was an assistant coach for Angolan club Petro de Luanda during the 2022 BAL season.

Old Dominion University statistics
Source

Awards and honors
CAA co-Player of the Year (1999)
three-time All-CAA selection 
three-time CAA All-Defensive team selection

References

External links
Mery Andrade Basketball Player Profile, Sacres Mapei Napoli, ODU, News, Seria A1 stats, Career, Games Logs, Bets, Awards - eurobasket.com

1975 births
Living people
Birmingham Squadron coaches
Charlotte Sting players
Cleveland Rockers players
Erie BayHawks (2019–2021) coaches
Old Dominion Monarchs women's basketball players
Portuguese expatriate basketball people in the United States
Portuguese women's basketball players
Power forwards (basketball)
San Diego Toreros women's basketball coaches
Small forwards
Sportspeople from Lisbon